Three Mantras is the second studio album by English band Cabaret Voltaire. It was released in May 1980, through record label Rough Trade.

Background and reception 
Record Mirror originally publicised Three Mantras as, '..what's been described as "the world's longest single"..', evidently referring to a press release supplied by the group's label, Rough Trade.
The album was packaged in an intentionally confusing manner, with the 'Eastern' and 'Western' titles reversed on the cover, the same label on both sides and a sticker on early pressings apologizing for there only being two mantras (despite the title) and explaining that the album was being priced as a single to make up for it. The reversed vocal that runs all the way through 'Eastern Mantra' is the name of another Sheffield electronic band - The Human League.

According to Trouser Press, Three Mantras is "the group's first explicit venture into non-Western musical forms". It further commented, "The record also marks a shift in technique, as musical demands take precedence over production to strange and beautiful effect."

Track listing

Personnel 
 Cabaret Voltaire

 Richard H. Kirk – guitar, wind instruments
 Stephen Mallinder – bass guitar, vocals, electronic percussion
 Chris Watson – synthesizers, tapes

 Additional personnel

 John Clayton – percussion (on "Eastern Mantra")
 Jane – tapes, Jerusalem market recordings (on "Eastern Mantra")

 Technical

 Cabaret Voltaire – recording, production
 George Peckham – mastering

References

External links 

 

1980 albums
Cabaret Voltaire (band) albums
Mute Records albums
Industrial albums